Bargal District is a district in the northeastern Bari region of Somalia. Its capital is located at Bargal.

References

Districts of Somalia
Bari, Somalia